Yitzhak Yitzhaky (born Yitzhok Lishovsky; 11 October 1902 – 21 September 1955) was an Israeli politician who served as a member of the Assembly of Representatives and Knesset.

Biography
Born in Rîbnița in the Russian Empire (today in Moldova), Yitzhaky served in the Red Army in the Russian Civil War. A member of HeHalutz, he helped organise Jewish self-defence against pogroms. He made aliyah to Palestine in 1921, and joined Gdud HaAvoda, in which he worked draining swamps, building roads and construction.

He became one of the leaders of the Left Poale Zion movement, and returned to Europe as an emissary for it in 1925. In 1934 he was amongst the founders of the Marxist Circles movement, and also helped establish the League for Arab-Jewish Co-operation. He later helped initiate the merger of Left Poale Zion and Ahdut HaAvoda, and was amongst the Mapam leadership after it was formed by a merger of Ahdut HaAvoda-Poale Zion and the Hashomer Hatzair Workers Party. He was elected to the Knesset on the Mapam list in the July 1955 elections, but died later that year. His seat was taken by Yussuf Hamis.

References

External links

1902 births
1955 deaths
Transnistrian people
Soviet military personnel
People of the Russian Civil War
20th-century Israeli Jews
Moldovan Jews
Israeli people of Moldovan-Jewish descent
Moldovan emigrants to Israel
Members of the Assembly of Representatives (Mandatory Palestine)
Members of the 3rd Knesset (1955–1959)
Soviet emigrants to Israel
Poale Zion politicians
Mapam politicians
Jewish socialists